Lobbying in South Australia is a growing activity, by which organizations or individuals attempt to influence the Government of South Australia in its policy, regulation and law-making. Since 1 December 2009, lobbyists commercially operating on behalf of third party interests are required to join a register and must also comply with a Code of Conduct. The register is available to the public via the website of the Department of the Premier and Cabinet, and lists the names of registered entities, their employed lobbyists and their clients. As of April 2015, sixty-five different entities are listed on the register, with notable examples including Bespoke Approach and Barker Wentworth.

Former politicians turned lobbyists 

Many consultant lobbyists in South Australia are former state or federal politicians. They include (listed with former party affiliations):

Senior public servants turned lobbyists 
Some lobbyists active in South Australia are former senior public servants. Former CEO of the Department of Planning, Transport and Infrastructure Rod Hook, now lobbying as Rod Hook & Associates is an example of this.

Resources and energy sector lobbyists 
During the Rann Government and more recently the Weatherill Government (post 2011), significant efforts were made to encourage mineral and energy resource development in South Australia. Government initiatives were welcomed by the private sector, many of which engaged third party lobbyists to further their objectives. Some lobbyists represent these sectors as part of a broader portfolio of interests (Bespoke Approach, for example)  while others such as Barker Wentworth are more specialised.  Crosby Textor is another high profile international lobbying firm active in this area in SA.

Marathon Resources compensation claim 
Exploration company Marathon Resources successfully lobbied the South Australian government for compensation after a ban on mining was introduced in the Arkaroola Protection Area, where the company had previously been exploring for uranium. In 2011, the company had three former Labor ministers, a former state Liberal MP and a former federal Liberal minister lobbying for the company or sitting on its board. The company's lobbyists included ALP lobbyist John Quirke, former Liberal MP Graham Gunn, and the firm Bespoke Approach (which is composed of Nick Bolkus, Alexander Downer and Ian Smith). Chris Schacht was sitting on the company's board during the compensation drive. In 2012, the company was paid $5 million in compensation by the Government of South Australia.

See also
Lobbying

External links 
 Lobbyist register - Government of South Australia

References 

Politics of South Australia